Macleay Island is an island in Moreton Bay, South East Queensland, Australia. The island constitutes a town and locality within the City of Redland.

Geography 
Macleay Island is the fourth largest island in Moreton Bay after North Stradbroke Island, Moreton Island and Russell Island; it is 6.5 km long and 4 km wide at its widest point. Perulpa Island is a small island attached to Macleay Island by a causeway.

Macleay Island has the following capes and beaches (from north to south):

 Potts Point (Coondooroopa)
 Sandpiper Beach
 Thompson Point
 Perrebinpa Point
 Point Pininpinin

History
For some time in the 1800s the island was called Tim Shea's Island after a convict who lived on the island for more than a decade. The current name was given by surveyor James Warner who named the island after Alexander Macleay who was the Colonial Secretary of New South Wales from 1825 to 1837.  The island has a rich history of the Aboriginal/indigenous peoples presence with middens and stone fish traps still found on the island.

A map advertising land for sale by John Cameron auctioneer, in central Macleay, Macleay Island consisted of 308 marine villa sites each of 1/4 acre and upwards to be held on the ground on Friday 10 December 1886. The land on offer bordered Kalara Street to the north, Kate Street to the east and Karrawarra Street to the south. The advertisement offered a free trip by steamer and free luncheon to attendees with terms 1/4 cash balance by promissory note at 3,6,9,12 and 15 months with 8% added.

Macleay Island State School opened on 28 January 1986.

However, the population includes a high number of owners who visit the island at weekends. Nearly a third of the 1,259 dwellings were listed as unoccupied at the time of the Tuesday night census.

During the 2006 state election, the Queensland Government prioritised construction of a single-officer police station for on the island it was needed with the increasing population. The station started operation in June 2008 and now has two rotating officers.

In 2007, after a short segment on the Nine television network's nationally broadcast A Current Affair based on the comments made by real estate watcher John Edwards of Residex said that Macleay Island was a "boom suburb" and worth watching by first home buyers.  All the South Moreton Bay Islands received a considerable amount of interest from buyers. A surge in building followed which forced the Redland City Council revise its population estimates.  It estimated 2,319 permanent residents on Macleay in 2008.  However, with a count of 1,479 dwellings, the peak number of people on the islands during holidays and weekends the total population is thought to have been 3,254.

The median age of the Macleay Island population was 52 years, 15 years above the national median of 37.  68.3% of people living in Macleay Island were born in Australia. The other top responses for country of birth were England 7.1%, New Zealand 6.7%, Germany 1.4%, Scotland 1.2%, Netherlands 0.6%.  87.9% of people spoke only English at home; the next most common languages were 1.2% German, 0.3% Italian, 0.2% French, 0.2% Auslan, 0.2% Greek.

In 2014, a skate park was opened.

In 2015, the ferry terminal and foreshore were upgraded in by Redland City Council, providing a recreational boat ramp and parking.

Heritage listings
Macleay Island has a number of heritage-listed sites, including:

 57-59 Charles Terrace: Tim Shea’s wetland and waterhole
 3-5 Cliff Terrace: Industrial Ruins of Campbell's Saltworks
 7-9 Corroboree Place: Corroboree Point (Lions Park)
 End Wharf Street, Thompson’s Point: Campbell's Wharf

Environment
The island's natural environment includes littoral rainforest, rocky shores, sandy beaches, mangrove areas and vistas to the mainland, over to North Stradbroke Island and up to Moreton Island.  There's a large variety of birds including migratory birds which visit yearly. There is a large bush stone curlew population on the island.

Transport
The island as a part of the southern Bay Islands can be accessed by passenger or vehicular ferry from Redland Bay. With the growing population, many residents commute to the mainland for work daily.  Translink GoCards are used on the fast ferry service to Redland Bay, with bus links from the ferry terminal. Travel time from Redland Bay is 18 minutes, this includes a short stop along the way at Karragarra Island.

Facilities
Macleay has a range of shops including cafes, pizza, hot bread, restaurants and supermarkets.  There's also a dentist, doctor, chemist, and vet as well as the island's emergency services. The large Community Centre and Hall is used by local groups. A Progress Association runs the island's library.

Recreation
Macleay Island has sandy beaches and mangrove foreshores.  These are spots for fishing, swimming, sailing, picnicking and barbecues. A launch spot is the Dalpura Ramp towards the north of the island. Pat's Park at the northern end of the island allows for swimming, BBQs, picnics and has children's play equipment.  The Anzac day services are held at the Cenotaph located there.  

Other recreational facilities include boat, bowling and golfing clubs.  The Heritage Trail is marked by signage for users.  Macleay is also home to a community of artists, and the Arts Centre is used by painters, potters, sculptors, plus other crafts. Bird watching is a common activity. There are also various classes available in martial arts, tai chi and yoga. Dragon-boating has recently commenced from the boat club on Sundays.

See also

 List of islands of Australia

References

External links

 
 1981 town maps:  and 

Islands of Moreton Bay
Suburbs of Redland City
Localities in Queensland